Bergeria octava is a moth of the family Erebidae. It was described by Sergius G. Kiriakoff in 1961. It is found in the Democratic Republic of the Congo.

References

Syntomini
Moths described in 1961
Insects of the Democratic Republic of the Congo
Erebid moths of Africa
Endemic fauna of the Democratic Republic of the Congo